Astatotilapia tweddlei is a species of fish in the family Cichlidae. It is found in Malawi and Mozambique. Its natural habitats are rivers and freshwater lakes.

This species was placed in the genus Astatotilapia by FishBase which while stating that the taxonomy is uncertain, Haplochromis is in their view restricted to the rivers and lakes of the drainage basin of Lake Victoria and they tentatively place this species in Astatotilapia. The IUCN state that until further research is undertaken A. tweddlei should be regarded as restricted to Lakes Chilwa and Chiuta and their drainages, as well as probably through the drainage of the Ruvuma River. The specific name honours the fisheries scientist Denis Tweddle of the Malawi Fisheries Research Unit.

References

Fish described in 1985
Taxa named by Peter Brian Neville Jackson
Cichlid fish of Africa
Fish of Malawi
Fish of Mozambique
Freshwater fish of Africa
Taxonomy articles created by Polbot
tweddlei
Taxobox binomials not recognized by IUCN